QuarkNet is a long-term, research-based teacher professional development program in the United States jointly funded by the National Science Foundation and the US Department of Energy. Since 1999, QuarkNet has established centers at universities and national laboratories conducting research in particle physics (also called high-energy physics) across the United States. Mentor physicists and physics teachers collaborate to bring cutting-edge physics to high school classrooms. QuarkNet offers research experiences for teachers and students, teacher workshops and sustained follow-on support. Through these activities, teachers enhance their knowledge and understanding of scientific research and transfer this experience to their classrooms, engaging students in both the substance and processes of contemporary physics research. Teachers may receive academic credit for their participation. QuarkNet programs are designed and conducted according to “best practices” described in the National Research Council National Science Education Standards report (1995) and support the Next Generation Science Standards (2013).

Data Camp
The summer Boot Camp is a continuing national activity that provides an opportunity for teachers to visit Fermilab and see the accelerators and detectors for themselves. Teachers from existing QuarkNet centers attend Boot Camp and form research groups to explore experimental data. They apply the physics that they know (i.e., energy and momentum conservation) to unravel the physics encoded in the data. This helps the teachers construct new knowledge about what has transpired inside the detector in exactly the same way that experimenters do. Teachers work in separate groups investigating triggers released by CMS in early 2011. The groups search the data for evidence of the J/Psi, Z and W bosons. They used Excel to reconstruct the invariant mass of a particle when given the four-vector of that particle's decay products.  In addition, participants attend several talks and go on tours of technical areas.

Cosmic Ray Studies
The main QuarkNet student investigations supported at the national level are cosmic ray studies. Working with Fermilab technicians and research physicists, QuarkNet staff has developed a classroom cosmic ray muon detector that uses the same technologies as the largest detectors at Fermilab and CERN. To support interschool collaboration, QuarkNet collaborates with the Interactions in Understanding the Universe Project (I2U2) to develop and support the Cosmic Ray e-Lab. An e-Lab is a student-led, teacher-guided investigation using experimental data. Students have an opportunity to organize and conduct authentic research and experience the environment of a scientific collaboration. Participating schools set up a detector somewhere at the school. Students collect and upload the data to a central server located at Argonne National Laboratory. Students can access data from all of the detectors in the cluster and use these data for studies, such as determining the (mean) lifetime of muons, the overall flux of muons in cosmic rays, or a study of extended air showers.

Fellows
In summer 2007, QuarkNet inaugurated the QuarkNet Fellows Program to develop the leadership potential of teachers who would work with staff to provide professional development activities and support for centers. Three groups of fellows in the areas of cosmic ray studies, LHC and teaching and learning share responsibilities for offering workshops and sessions, developing workshop materials, supporting e-Labs and masterclasses, giving presentations at AAPT and more. In 2009 a new group of fellows joined the program. Leadership fellows work with staff to support centers and gather data about center performance.

Masterclass
In 2007, QuarkNet first piloted U.S. Masterclasses, modeled on a program offered by EPPOG and studying Large Electron–Positron Collider-era CERN data. Today masterclasses study ALICE, ATLAS or CMS data. Masterclasses are one-day national events in which teams of students visit a nearby university or research center to gain insight into topics and methods of particle physics. During the day students:

Attend lectures on the Standard Model and learn how to analyze events.
Analyze 1,000 events from various CERN particle physics experiments.
Discuss results with three to six other student teams, in a videoconference moderated by physicists at CERN or Fermilab.

2007 was an analysis of electron–positron interactions at the DELPHI and OPAL detectors from the LEP experiments.

2009 was an analysis of simulated proton–proton collisions in the ATLAS detector. "Hidden" in the data was one single event which represented the expected signature from the Higgs Boson.

2010 was a return to LEP data.

2011 was the first year that LHC data were incorporated into the masterclass There were exercises for ATLAS (Z- and W-bosons measurements), ALICE (for stranger particles), and CMS (J/ψ meson).

2012 saw the incorporation of expanded CMS data (W/Z measurement; J/psi measurement still available but not supported for International Masterclasses).

Summer Student Research Program
Based on a model at the University of Notre Dame, QuarkNet has offered a summer student research program since 2004. Typically, teams of four high school students supervised by one teacher spend six weeks involved in various physics research projects. Some centers choose to modify this model, involving more students and/or less time. The research is associated with ATLAS and CMS, the International Linear Collider R&D, cosmic ray muon detectors, optical fiber R&D and more. Teams are supported at up to 25 centers each summer. Examples of recent research titles include: Search and Identification of Comparing the Amount of Muon Events to Daily Weather Changes, Cosmic Ray Signals in Radar Echo, Fibers for Forward Calorimeter, The Effects of Impurities on Radio Signal Detection in Ice, Quartz Plate Calorimetery, Galactic Asymmetry of the Milky Way and RF Magnet Design, and Weak Lensing Mass Estimates of the Elliot Arc Cluster.

References

External links
QuarkNet
Fermilab
CERN
Cosmic Ray e-Lab
Interactions in Understanding the Universe
More On DataCamp

Physics education
1999 establishments in the United States